Stephen Keith Lang (March 24, 1949 – February 4, 2017) was a Canadian bassist best known for his time and work with the rock band April Wine from 1976 to 1984 during the band's most successful years.

Early life 
Lang was born in Montreal, Quebec. He was the father of musician Erin Lang.

Career 
Lang joined April Wine in 1976, replacing then-bassist Jim Clench. That year he recorded with the band for their fifth studio album The Whole World's Goin' Crazy (1976).

Lang left April Wine in 1984 and pursued the financial field and former original bassist Jim Clench rejoined after Langs departure and took over bass duties until the band disbanded in 1986.

When April Wine reformed in 1992 for a tour, Lang was offered to rejoin the band but ultimately decided not to and stuck with his investment business. Jim Clench was then drafted back into the band. Clench died in 2010.

Death 
Although no official cause of death has been announced Lang reportedly suffered from Parkinson's disease and died on February 4, 2017, at the age of 67.

Discography

With April Wine 

 The Whole World's Goin' Crazy (1976)
 Live at the El Mocambo (1977)
 Forever for Now (1977)
 First Glance (1978)
 Greatest Hits (1979)
 Harder... Faster (1979)
 Monsters of Rock (1980)
 The Nature of the Beast (1981)
 Live in London (1981)
 Power Play (1982)
 Animal Grace (1984)
 Classic Masters (2002)

See also 
 Canadian rock
 Music of Canada

References 

1949 births
2017 deaths
April Wine members
Mashmakhan members
Canadian rock bass guitarists
Musicians from Montreal